Elizabeth Gardner (born 4 September 1980 in Melbourne, Australia), also known as Liz Gardner, is an Australian freestyle skier

Professional career
Gardner made her professional debut on 8 September 2001 at the Mount Buller women's aerial event. Since her debut, she has competed in the Europa, Nor-Am, and World Cup. Her coach is Michel Roth.

Her best World Cup result was third at Fernie, British Columbia and Sauze d'Oulx, Italy.

She has participated in two Olympic games; the 2006 Turin Olympics and the 2010 Vancouver Winter Games. Gardner finished 23rd in Turin, and finished 10th in Vancouver.

Personal life
Her nicknames vary from Gards and Beth to Lizard. Gardner was a gymnast before switching to aerials. She completed a bachelor's degree in Applied Science (Human Movement) at the Royal Melbourne Institute of Technology.

References

External links
 
 
 
 

1980 births
Freestyle skiers at the 2006 Winter Olympics
Freestyle skiers at the 2010 Winter Olympics
Living people
Australian female freestyle skiers
Olympic freestyle skiers of Australia